Secular Thought (1887–1911) was a Canadian periodical, published in Toronto, dedicated to promoting the principles of freethought and secularism. Founded and edited during its first several years by English freethinker Charles Watts, the editorship was assumed by Toronto printer and publisher James Spencer Ellis in 1891 when Watts returned to England. During that period, Secular Thought was the principal organ of the freethought movement in Canada, publishing large amounts of material from England and the United States in addition to commenting on Canadian affairs.

References

External links
Internet Archive (holds vols. 31–37, 1905–1911)

Freethought
Secularism in Canada
Rationalism
Newspapers published in Toronto
Publications established in 1887
Publications disestablished in 1911
1887 establishments in Ontario
1911 disestablishments in Ontario
Biweekly newspapers published in Canada